Bob Gray (born April 25, 1939) is an American former cross-country skier. He competed at the 1968 Winter Olympics and the 1972 Winter Olympics.

Gray's siblings included William B. Gray, who served as United States Attorney for Vermont. His daughter, Molly Gray, served as lieutenant governor of Vermont from 2021-2023.

References

1939 births
Living people
American male cross-country skiers
Olympic cross-country skiers of the United States
Cross-country skiers at the 1968 Winter Olympics
Cross-country skiers at the 1972 Winter Olympics
People from Brattleboro, Vermont
Sportspeople from Vermont
20th-century American people